Bernardazzi is a surname. Notable people with the surname include:

Alexander Bernardazzi (1831–1907), Russian architect
Giuseppe Bernardazzi (1816–1891), Swiss architect